Shadows of the Moulin Rouge is a 1913 American silent drama film directed by Alice Guy and starring Fraunie Fraunholz, Claire Whitney and Joseph Levering. It was produced by Solax Studios at Fort Lee, then picked up for release by William Fox's Box Office Attractions, a forerunner of Fox Film.

Cast
 Fraunie Fraunholz as Dr. Chevrele 
 Claire Whitney as Mrs. Dupont 
 Joseph Levering as Mr. Dupont 
 John Scott
 George Paxton

References

Bibliography
 St. Pierre, Paul Matthew. E.A. Dupont and his Contribution to British Film: Varieté, Moulin Rouge, Piccadilly, Atlantic, Two Worlds, Cape Forlorn. Fairleigh Dickinson University Press, 2010.

External links
 

1913 films
1913 drama films
1910s English-language films
American silent feature films
Silent American drama films
Films directed by Alice Guy-Blaché
American black-and-white films
Films set in Paris
Films shot in Fort Lee, New Jersey
1910s American films